The great-billed heron (Ardea sumatrana) is a wading bird of the heron family, resident from southeast Asia to Papua New Guinea and Australia.

Description

It is larger than the purple heron, which it resembles in appearance, although it is larger and darker. The plumage is largely dark grey above. In flight, it has a uniform dark grey upperwing.

The flight is slow, with its neck retracted. This is characteristic of herons and bitterns, and distinguishes them from storks, cranes and spoonbills, which extend their necks. The species feeds in shallow water, spearing fish with its long, sharp bill. It will wait motionless for prey, or slowly stalk its victim.

Distribution and habitat
The great-billed heron has a very large range, occurring in much of coastal Southern Asia and Australasia including Australia, India, Indonesia, Malaysia, and the Philippines. Its habitats are largely coastal such as islands, coral reefs, mangroves, large rivers. However, occasionally, it can be found inland in shallow ponds.

References

External links 

 BirdLife Species Factsheet

great-billed heron
Birds of New Guinea
Birds of the Northern Territory
Birds of Cape York Peninsula
Birds of Southeast Asia
great-billed heron